Do Won Chang (Hangul: 장도원; born March 20, 1954) is a Korean-born American businessman. He founded the clothing store chain Forever 21 with his wife Jin Sook Chang.

Early life 
Chang grew up in South Korea and moved to California in 1981 with his wife, Jin Sook Chang. He never attended university and worked in coffee shops growing up.

Career 
He and his wife, Jin Sook (Hangul: 진숙), opened a 900-square foot clothing store then named Fashion 21 in 1984 in Highland Park, Los Angeles with only $11,000 in savings. The store took off, and as they expanded to other locations, the store's name was changed to Forever 21 otherwise known as XXI. The number of stores grew to 600, with 30,000 employees by 2015. The company has remained a family-owned operation. It has filed for bankruptcy protection as of 2019.

Personal life 
Do Won Chang and Jin Sook Chang have two children, and live in Beverly Hills, California. They are Christians, which is why John 3:16 is on the bottom of every bag.

Their two daughters, Esther and Linda Chang co-founded the company Riley Rose, a make-up and accessory company that Forever 21 carries in its stores. Linda was also in charge of marketing at Forever 21, while Esther was in charge of visual design.

Philanthropy 
The Changs have donated money to churches and faith groups, and Do Won travels to perform missionary work.

References 

1954 births
American billionaires
American retail chief executives
American fashion businesspeople
Businesspeople from California
South Korean emigrants to the United States
Living people